The 2003 TCU Horned Frogs football team represented Texas Christian University in the 2003 NCAA Division I-A football season. TCU finished with an 11–2 (7–1 C-USA) record.  The team was coached by Gary Patterson and played their home games at Amon G. Carter Stadium, which is located on campus in Fort Worth.

Schedule

Roster

References

TCU
TCU Horned Frogs football seasons
TCU Horned Frogs football